Juan Lewis (born September 18, 1989) is a male track and field athlete from West End, Grand Bahama in The Bahamas, who mainly competes in the 400m and 200 He attended Bishop Michael Eldon School and Sunland Baptist Academy before competing for Southwestern Christian College and the UT Arlington Mavericks. Lewis ran the third leg of the 4 x 400 Relay at the 2010 IAAF World Indoor Championships in Doha, Qatar.

Lewis won a silver medal in the under 17 Boys 400m at the 2005 CARIFTA Games in Tobago.
He won a silver medal at the 2006 CARIFTA Games in Guadeloupe running the second leg of the  Relay.

Personal bests

Achievements

References

External links
World Athletics Bio
University of Texas At Arlington Bio
Athleic Net Bio
Lewis 4x 400m Relay Carifta 2006

1989 births
Living people
Bahamian male sprinters
People from West Grand Bahama
Junior college men's track and field athletes in the United States
University of Texas at Arlington alumni